The 1952 Kentucky Derby was the 78th running of the Kentucky Derby. The race took place on May 3, 1952.

Full results

References

1952
Kentucky Derby
Derby
Kentucky
Kentucky Derby